Diplommatina circumstomata is a species of land snails with an operculum, terrestrial gastropod mollusks in the family Diplommatinidae.

This species is endemic to Japan.

References

Diplommatina
Gastropods described in 1980
Taxa named by Nagamichi Kuroda
Taxonomy articles created by Polbot
Endemic fauna of Japan